KwaNobuhle is the largest township on the outskirts of Uitenhage, followed by KwaLanga in the Eastern Cape province of the Republic of South Africa.

Water supply
KwaNobuhle has been one of the townships in the region that have experienced problems with disrupted water supply or water restrictions during droughts due low levels in the Kouga Dam and Lourie Dam. Completion of the  Nooitgedacht water scheme, implemented by Amatola Water and financed by the Department of Water and Sanitation is seen as a way to alleviate these problems.

References

Populated places in Nelson Mandela Bay
Populated places established in 1804